Cats 101 is a television series about cats that airs on Animal Planet and reruns on Discovery Family.

Plot 
Cats 101 features different cat breeds per episode, discussed by experts, ranging from veterinarians to animal trainers. The show presents facts, origins, and descriptions of the breeds, with comments from cat owners.

Breeds featured

Season 1 
 American Shorthair
 Egyptian Mau
 Himalayan
 Maine Coon
 Oriental
 Persian
 Ragdoll
 Savannah
 Siamese
 Scottish Fold
 Sphynx
 Turkish Angora

Season 2 
 Abyssinian
 American Curl
 Birman
 Bombay
 Burmese
 Colorpoint Shorthair
 Cornish Rex
 Exotic
 Havana Brown
 Japanese Bobtail
 Manx
 Ocicat
 Norwegian Forest Cat
 Russian Blue
 Selkirk Rex
 Siberian
 Singapura
 Somali

Season 3 
 American Bobtail
 Australian Mist
 Balinese
 Bambino
 Bengal
 British Shorthair
 Chartreux
 Cheetoh
 Devon Rex
 Domestic House Cat
 Domestic Longhair
 Domestic Shorthair
 Korat
 LaPerm
 Munchkin
 Napoleon (Minuet)
 Nebelung
 Pixie-Bob
 RagaMuffin
 Serengeti
 Snowshoe
 Tonkinese
 Toyger
 Turkish Van

Season 4 
 Aegean
 American Wirehair
 Arabian Mau
 Burmilla
 Chantilly
 Chausie
 Donskoy
 Chinese Li Hua
 Dwelf
 European Shorthair
 Highlander
 Javanese
 Khao Manee
 Kurilian Bobtail
 Lambkin
 Minskin
 Oriental Bicolor
 Peterbald
 Skookum
 Sokoke

References

External links
 
 

Animal Planet original programming
2000s American documentary television series
2010s American documentary television series
2009 American television series debuts
2012 American television series endings
Television series about cats